Hale's or Hale Bros., was a department store based in Sacramento with branches throughout the San Francisco Bay Area.

In 1880 Prentis Cobb Hale and his two brothers opened the Criterion store in Downtown Sacramento, and in 1881 they renamed it Hale Brothers & Company. The company opened large branches in San Francisco (1892) and San Jose (1896), Salinas, Stockton and Petaluma, and via an acquisition of Whitthorne & Swann in 1906, Oakland.

The Sacramento store was last located at 825-831 K Street, with a storefront measuring some 123 feet on K and 160 feet on Ninth.

The San Jose store was at the corner of 1st and San Carlos. The San Francisco store was first located at 989 Market Street, then moved to 901 Market at Fifth in a building designed by Reid & Reid.

In 1949, Hale's bought their Sacramento rival, Weinstock, Lubin & Co. In the same year, Hale's merged with Los Angeles-based Broadway Department Stores, becoming Broadway-Hale Stores, Carter Hawley Hale Stores, and later Broadway-Hale Stores''.

Hale Bros. had 30% ownership of J. M. Hale Co., also known as Hales, in Los Angeles, founded by one of the Hale Brothers, James M. Hale (1846-1946).

References

External links
"Hale's", Department Store Museum (blog)

Defunct department stores based in Sacramento
History of Sacramento, California
History of San Jose, California
History of San Francisco